The 2010–11 Bosnia and Herzegovina Football Cup is the sixteenth season of Bosnia and Herzegovina's annual football cup, and an eleventh season of the unified competition.  The competition started in September 2010 and will conclude with the final in May 2011.  The winner qualified for the second qualifying round of the 2011–12 UEFA Europa League.

Preliminary round

|}

First round
These matches were played on 14 and 15 September 2010.

|}

Second round
The 16 winners from the previous round competed in this stage of the competition. The first legs were played on 29 and 30 September and the second legs were played on 19 and 20 October 2010.

|}

Quarter-finals
The 8 winners from the previous round competed in this stage of the competition. The first legs were played on 3 and 4 November and the second legs were played on 10 November 2010.

|}

Semi-finals
The 4 winners from the previous round competed in this stage of the competition. The first legs took place on 23 and 30 March and the second legs took place on 6 April 2011.

|}

Final

First leg

Second leg

Željezničar won 4–0 on aggregate.

References

Bosnia and Herzegovina Football Cup seasons
Cup
Bosnia